"Rampage" (a.k.a. "Slow Down, Baby") is the second hit single released from EPMD's third album, Business as Usual. EPMD's new-found labelmate, LL Cool J contributed a verse on the song, while Pete Rock would provide the remix to the song. "Rampage" found its greatest success on the Rap charts, peaking at #2.

Single track listing
"Rampage" (Remix Extended)- 4:35  
"Rampage" (Hardcore to the Head Mix)- 4:41  
"Rampage" (Remix Radio Edit)- 3:51  
"Rampage" (Remix Instrumental)- 4:33  
"Rampage" (Hardcore To The Head Mix Instrumental)- 4:37  
"I'm Mad" (DJ Scratch Jazz Mix)- 3:46  
"I'm Mad" (Red Man Mix)- 3:44  
"I'm Mad" (LP Version)- 3:39  
"Rampage" (LP Version)- 3:50

Charts

1991 singles
EPMD songs
LL Cool J songs
Songs written by Erick Sermon
Songs written by LL Cool J
Songs written by PMD (rapper)
1990 songs
Def Jam Recordings singles
Columbia Records singles